Alexander Savchenkov (born September 30, 1973) is a Russian former professional ice hockey forward who last played for Krylya Sovetov team in Russia. He scored 123 goals in 453 games in Russian championship.

In 2002-2003 season Savchenkov scored 12 goals in eight games against Moscow's teams in Russian championship.

Honours
Russian championship:  2000, 2005, 2007

International statistics

External links

1973 births
HC Dynamo Moscow players
Metallurg Magnitogorsk players
Krylya Sovetov Moscow players
Living people
Ice hockey people from Moscow
Russian ice hockey coaches
Russian ice hockey right wingers
Soviet Wings players
Tallahassee Tiger Sharks players
Utah Grizzlies (IHL) players
HC Vityaz players
Johnstown Chiefs players
Sacramento River Rats players